

Laguna Tumichuqua is a lake in the Beni Department, Bolivia. Its surface area is 3.4 km².

References 

Lakes of Beni Department